Tubal-cain or Tubalcain ( – Tūḇal Qayīn) is a person mentioned in the Bible, in , known for being the first blacksmith. He is stated as the "forger of all instruments of bronze and iron". A descendant of Cain, he was the son of Lamech and Zillah. Tubal-cain was the brother of Naamah and half-brother of Jabal and Jubal. The Israeli kibbutz Tuval is named after him.

Jewish narrative 
According to Rashi, Tubal-cain's name literally means "Cain's-Spices", with the Hebrew word Tū́ḇal deriving from the word Tū́ḇlin meaning spices. Rashi states that he was named this, because he "seasoned and improved the work of Cain". In other words, because he was a blacksmith, who helped to make weapons which could be used to kill more efficiently, he invokes his ancestor Cain's sin of murder. Furthermore according to Tanhuma bar Abba, one day, Tubal-cain and his father, Lamech, were hunting together with Tubal-cain serving as an aid for his blind father. In the distance is Cain who Lamech believes to be an animal. He checks with Tubal-cain to see if it is an animal, but Tubal-cain deceives his father, and lets him shoot and kill his forefather Cain, possibly because of Tubal-cain's blood lust. When Lamech realizes what he has done, he throws his hands up in a fit of mourning, accidentally killing his son Tubal-cain. However Genesis Rabbah disagrees with this narrative. 

In Antiquities of the Jews, Josephus says that "Tubal exceeded all men in strength, and was very expert and famous in martial performances, ... and first of all invented the art of working brass."

Christian narrative 

In the King James Version, his name is rendered as Tubalcain. In the New International Version and the English Standard Version, it is Tubal-cain; the Latin Vulgate renders him as Thubalcain. It is not clear why he has a double-barreled first name. Gordon Wenham suggests that the name Cain means smith (which would anticipate the remarks about his metalworking skill), or that he is called Tubal Cain in order to distinguish him from the other Tubal, the son of Japheth. The intended conclusion here is that "Cain" (given earlier in the idea of "obtaining") was merged with "Tubal", a word seemingly to denote "withering" by contextual speculation. Genesis 4:22 says that Tubal-cain was the "forger of all instruments of bronze and iron" (ESV) or an "instructor of every artificer in brass and iron" (KJV). Although this may mean he was a metalsmith, a comparison with verses 20 and 21 suggests that he may have been the very first artificer in brass and iron. T. C. Mitchell suggests that he "discovered the possibilities of cold forging native copper and meteoric iron." Tubal-cain has even been described as the first chemist. Walter Elwell suggests that his invention of superior weapons may have been the motivation for Lamech's interest in avenging blood. Alternatively, E. E. Kellett suggests that Tubal-cain may have been a miner.

Popular culture
A fictionalized version of Tubal-cain serves as the primary antagonist in the film Noah'', also depicted as a master metalworker, and a nemesis of Noah. The character's younger version is played by Finn Wittrock and the older version is played by Ray Winstone.

Family tree

References

External links

Book of Genesis people
Bereshit (parashah)
Blacksmiths